The wheelchair curling competition of the 2010 Winter Paralympics was held at the Vancouver Olympic/Paralympic Centre in Vancouver, British Columbia, Canada, from 13 March to 20 March 2010. Ten teams competed in a single event, a mixed tournament in which men and women competed together.

Medal summary

Medal table

Events

* suspended

Teams 
Each team consists of five curlers and must include at least one person from each gender.

Qualification 
Qualification for the 2010 Paralympics was based on rankings in the 2007, 2008, and 2009 World Wheelchair Curling Championships. Points were awarded for a top-ten finish in these three competitions, with twelve points given for taking first place and one point for tenth place. The nine countries with the most points were to qualify for the Vancouver Games, while the tenth slot was reserved for the host country, Canada. Because the Canadian team placed within the top nine point-scorers, the tenth slot was given to the tenth-ranked team, Japan.

Notes
England, Scotland, and Wales compete separately at the World Wheelchair Curling Championships but compete together as "Great Britain" at the Paralympics. Under an agreement between the curling federations in these three areas, only points earned by the Scottish team counted towards Great Britain's Paralympic qualifying total.

Standings

Playoffs

Sessions
All times are local (UTC−8).

Session 1

13 March 2010, 12:30

Session 2

13 March 2010, 18:00

Session 3

14 March 2010, 12:30

Session 4

14 March 2010, 18:00

Session 5

15 March 2010, 12:30

Session 6

15 March 2010, 18:00

Session 7

16 March 2010, 12:30

Session 8

16 March 2010, 18:00

Session 9

17 March 2010, 12:30

Session 10

17 March 2010, 18:00

Session 11

18 March 2010, 12:30

Session 12

18 March 2010, 18:00

Tie-breaker Session 1

19 March 2010, 14:30

Semifinals

20 March 2010, 10:00

Bronze Medal Game

20 March 2010, 15:30

Gold Medal Game 

20 March 2010, 15:30

See also
Curling at the 2010 Winter Olympics

References

 Wheelchair Curling – Sports – Vancouver 2010
 Wheelchair Curling Schedule
 
 
Official Results Book - Wheelchair Curling - 13 to 20 March, Vancouver 2010

2010
2010 Winter Paralympics events
Winter Paralympics